Allacta is a genus in the family Ectobiidae.

Taxonomy
Allacta contains the following species:
 Allacta diagrammatica
 Allacta figurata
 Allacta bimaculata
 Allacta alba
 Allacta bipunctata
 Allacta australiensis
 Allacta transversa

References

cockroaches